Ebony Horsewomen, Inc. Equestrian and Therapeutic Center is an equine therapeutic mental health center in Hartford, Connecticut. Founded in 1984, Ebony Horsewomen, Inc. is the only African-American organization in the country doing intensive equine-assisted psychotherapeutic work with adults, families, military veterans, and children. Ebony Horsewoman, Inc. hosts comprehensive and interactive equine therapeutic training workshops for mental health professionals as well as equine youth programs such as the Junior Mounted Patrol Unit, through which mounted community ambassadors help patrol Hartford's historic Keney Park, and the Saturday Saddle Club, in partnership with the University of Connecticut 4-H Club.

Organization history 
Ebony Horsewomen, Inc. Equestrian and Therapeutic Center is a nationally recognized 501(c) (3) nonprofit equine therapeutic organization founded by CEO Patricia E. Kelly, who is a veteran of the United States Marines and long-time community leader who initially started the organization as an equestrian club for Black-women equestrians. Patricia Kelly wanted to help improve the quality of life in her community, so Ebony Horsewomen soon became a full-service equine therapeutic center which houses horses, small therapy animals, and agriculture. The organization is a 36-year institution in Hartford's historic, 693-acre Keney Park area in the Northend. Ebony Horsewomen Equestrian and Therapeutic Center is nationally recognized and has won numerous awards for helping empower youth. Patricia Kelly is in the National Cowgirl Hall of Fame and Museum, an inductee in the National Multicultural Western Heritage Museum Hall of Fame, and a CNN Top 10 Hero who has made appearances on The Queen Latifah Show and The Dr. Oz Show to talk about the work Ebony Horsewomen does in their community.

Programs 
Ebony Horsewomen provides workshops for mental health professionals, equine-assisted psychotherapy for families, youth, first responders and military veterans, therapeutic riding lessons, and equine youth programs. Program participants have access to fully equipped horse stables, a cooking cottage, outdoor riding rings and an heated indoor riding arena for year-round therapy and lessons, and close proximity to a variety of small farm animals which makes for a nurturing learning environment and memorable experiences.

References

External links 
 

Equestrian organizations
Sports in Hartford, Connecticut